The men's individual sprint Nordic combined competition for the 2002 Winter Olympics in Salt Lake City at Utah Olympic Park and Soldier Hollow on 21 and 22 February.

Results

Ski Jumping

Athletes did one large hill ski jump. Points earned on the jump determined the starting order and times for the cross-country race; each point was equal to a 4-second deficit.

Cross-Country

The cross-country race was over a distance of 7.5 kilometres.

References

Nordic combined at the 2002 Winter Olympics